

Transport
The village is near National Highway 37 and connected to nearby towns and cities with regular buses and other modes of transportation. The nearest city to Ukiam is Chhaygaon which is about 28 km away. The road has been newly constructed in 2014 and is in good condition.

See also
 Uparhali
 Topatali
 Toparpathar
 Topabari
 Tokradia

References

Villages in Kamrup district